= Mordellistena nigropectoralis =

Scientific classification
- Domain: Eukaryota
- Kingdom: Animalia
- Phylum: Arthropoda
- Class: Insecta
- Order: Coleoptera
- Suborder: Polyphaga
- Infraorder: Cucujiformia
- Family: Mordellidae
- Genus: Mordellistena
- Species: M. nigropectoralis

Binomial name
- Mordellistena nigropectoralis Ermisch (1952)

Species of beetle

Mordellistena nigropectoralis is a species of beetle in the genus Mordellistena of the family Mordellidae. It was described by Ermisch in 1952.
